José Guillermo Ruiz Burguete (born 24 January 1976) is a Mexican gridiron football coach. He previously played in the NFL Europe with the Frankfurt Galaxy.

Playing career

College career
Ruiz Burguete played college football for the Centinelas CGP in 1995 and 1996 and later for the Borregos Salvajes Monterrey from 1998 to 2000, receiving a scholarship to study at the Monterrey Institute of Technology and Higher Education, where he majored in Business Administration.

During his college career, he won two National Championships in 1998 and 1999.

NFL Europe
In 2004, Ruiz Burguete was signed by the Frankfurt Galaxy of the NFL Europe.

National team
Ruiz Burguete was part of the Mexico national American football team that competed in the 1999 and 2003 IFAF World Championship, where he was included in the All-Star Team of the tournament.

Coaching career
In November 2016, Ruiz Burguete was appointed head coach of the Dinos de Saltillo of the Liga de Fútbol Americano Profesional (LFA) ahead of the 2017 LFA season.

In September 2017, he left the Dinos and was appointed as Commissioner of the LFA, but he resigned in January 2018.

In November 2021, Ruiz Burguete was appointed head coach of the Galgos de Tijuana.

References

1976 births
Living people
Mexican players of American football
American football linebackers
Borregos Salvajes Monterrey players
Mexican expatriate sportspeople in Germany
Expatriate players of American football
Sportspeople from Mexico City
Coaches of American football
Mexican sports coaches